The County Galway LTC Tournament a late Victorian era grass court tennis tournament staged first staged in August 1879. The tournament was organised by the County Galway Lawn Tennis Club, and held at Lisbeg, County Galway, Ireland. The tournament was held only two times and ended in 1880.

History
The County Galway LTC Tournament was a grass court tennis event first staged from 6 to 8 August 1879.   This tournament was held for two edition only, and appeared to have ended. This event was organised by the  County Galway Lawn Tennis Club, and held at Lisbeg, County Galway, Ireland. The first mens singles title was won by William Henry George Eyre, and the second men's singles event was won by Ernest de Sylly Hamilton Browne.

References

External links
 Galway Lawn Tennis Club

Sources
 Nieuwland, Alex. "Tournament – County Galway". www.tennisarchives.com. Tennis Archives.   
 Travers, Alan. "About Us". gltc.ie. Galway Lawn Tennis Club.  
 The Field. (9 August 1879) London, England: British Newspaper Archives.

Republic of Ireland
1879 establishments in Ireland
Grass court tennis tournaments
Tennis tournaments in Ireland